Cooperage is a Canadian short documentary film, directed by Phillip Borsos and released in 1976. A process documentary about the making of wooden barrels, it won the Canadian Film Award for Best Theatrical Short Film at the 27th Canadian Film Awards.

References

External links

1976 films
National Film Board of Canada documentaries
Films directed by Phillip Borsos
Canadian short documentary films
1970s short documentary films
National Film Board of Canada short films
Best Theatrical Short Film Genie and Canadian Screen Award winners
1970s English-language films
1970s Canadian films